Middle Fork may refer to:

Middle Fork, Kentucky
Middle Fork, Tennessee
Middle Fork, West Virginia
Middle Fork Township, Forsyth County, North Carolina
Middle Fork River, West Virginia
Middle Fork River (South Fork), part of the South Fork New River in North Carolina.
Middle Fork Popo Agie River in Wyoming

See also
Middlefork (disambiguation)